(former name; Ken Ota, 太田 健) is a former Japanese football player.

Playing career
Fujita was born in Hamamatsu on August 27, 1979. He joined J1 League club Júbilo Iwata from a youth team in 1998. However he did not play in any matches and left the club end of 1998 season. After two years, he joined the J2 League club Ventforet Kofu in 2001. He became a regular player during the first season and played many matches as offensive midfielder for a long time. He wore the number 10 shirt for the club from 2002 to 2010. The club finished in last place in 2001, at middle place from 2002 to 2004, the club won the third place in 2005 and was promoted to J1 in 2006. Although the club was relegated to J2 in 2008, the club was promoted to J1 from 2011. However he was released from the club at the end of the 2010 season. After a year, he joined the Estonian club Tallinna Kalev in 2012. He retired at the end of the 2012 season.

Club statistics

References

External links

1979 births
Living people
Association football people from Shizuoka Prefecture
Japanese footballers
J1 League players
J2 League players
Júbilo Iwata players
Ventforet Kofu players
Japanese expatriate footballers
Association football midfielders